Bieler Bros. Records is an independent record label in Florida.

History
Bieler Bros. Records was formed in January 2002 by brothers Aaron and Jason Bieler. The label was aligned with MCA Records before becoming independent.

Distribution
Distribution in the United States is handled by Alternative Distribution Alliance (a subsidiary of Warner Music Group). Bieler Bros. also have offices located in the United Kingdom, and have distribution for Canada through eOne Music Canada, Germany, Austria and Switzerland.

Label roster

Current artists
 Ankla
 Another Black Day
 A Silent Film
 City of God
 Censura!
 Deathstars
 diRTy WoRMz
 Esoterica
 Fiction Plane
 In Whispers
 Into The Presence
 Karnivool
 Look Right Penny
 Mobile
 Raintime
 Stam1na
 Stereoside
 Tetanus
 Uncrowned
 Wide Eye Panic
 Will Haven

Previous artists
 Bomb Factory
 Burn Season
 Egypt Central
 Fiction Plane
 Nonpoint
 SikTh
 Skindred
 Slaves on Dope
 Smile Empty Soul
 SOiL
 Sunset Black

See also
 List of record labels

External links
 Official site

American independent record labels
Record labels established in 2002
Heavy metal record labels
Rock record labels
Alternative rock record labels
2002 establishments in Florida